Svalöv Municipality (Svalövs kommun) is a municipality in Skåne County in southern Sweden. Its seat is located in the town Svalöv.

The local government reform of 1952 grouped the 15 original entities into six larger municipalities. In two steps, 1969 and 1971 they were amalgamated to form the present municipality.

The most common housing category is one-family houses.

There are local pågatåg trains connecting Teckomatorp, in the south of the municipality, with Malmö, Lund and Helsingborg. To get to the town of Svalöv, one can take a bus (approximately 15 minutes) from Teckomatorp.

The villages Röstånga, Kågeröd, Teckomatorp, Svalöv itself and parts of Söderåsen National Park are located in the municipality.  The villages are all connected via local buses.

Knutstorp Castle is situated in the municipality along with the Ring Knutstorp race track. The famous astronomer Tycho Brahe was born there.

Urban areas
There are 6 urban areas (also called a Tätort or locality) in Svalöv Municipality.

In the table they are listed according to the size of the population as of December 31, 2005. The municipal seat is in bold characters.

References
Statistics Sweden

External links

Svalöv - Official site
Coat of arms

Municipalities of Skåne County